The United Nations Educational, Scientific and Cultural Organization (UNESCO) designates World Heritage Sites of outstanding universal value to cultural or natural heritage which  have been nominated by countries that are signatories to the UNESCO World Heritage Convention, established in 1972. Cultural heritage consists of monuments (such as architectural works, monumental sculptures, or inscriptions), groups of buildings, and sites (including archaeological sites). Natural heritage is defined as natural features (consisting of physical and biological formations), geological and physiographical formations (including habitats of threatened species of animals and plants), and natural sites which are important from the point of view of science, conservation or natural beauty. Ukraine  officially adopted the UNESCO Convention and become an independent member on 12 October 1988, while still officially being a Union Republic of the Soviet Union (prior to its dissolution in 1991).

, there are eight World Heritage Sites listed in Ukraine, seven of which are cultural sites and one of which, the Ancient and Primeval Beech Forests of the Carpathians and Other Regions of Europe, is a natural site. The first site listed was "Kyiv: Saint-Sophia Cathedral and Related Monastic Buildings, Kyiv-Pechersk Lavra", in 1990. The most recent site listed was the Historic Centre of Odesa, in 2023. The site was immediately listed as endangered because of the 2022 Russian invasion of Ukraine. Three sites are transnational: the Wooden Tserkvas are shared with Poland, the Struve Geodetic Arc is shared with nine countries, and the Ancient and Primeval Beech Forests are shared with 16 countries. In addition, Ukraine has 17 sites on its tentative list.

World Heritage Sites 

UNESCO lists sites under ten criteria; each entry must meet at least one of the criteria. Criteria i through vi are cultural, and vii through x are natural.

Tentative list

In addition to the sites on the World Heritage list, member states can maintain a list of tentative sites that they may consider for nomination. Nominations for the World Heritage list are only accepted if the site has previously been listed on the tentative list. , Ukraine had 16 such sites on its tentative list.

See also

 List of historic reserves in Ukraine
 Tourism in Ukraine

References

Ukraine
 List
World Heritage Sites
World Heritage Sites